The 2008 Kashgar attack occurred on the morning of 4 August 2008, in the city of Kashgar in the Western Chinese province of Xinjiang. According to Chinese government sources, it was a terrorist attack perpetrated by two men with suspected ties to the Uyghur separatist movement. The men reportedly drove a truck into a group of approximately 70 jogging police officers, and proceeded to attack them with grenades and machetes, resulting in the death of sixteen officers.

Background
The Uyghurs are the largest ethnic group in ethnically diverse Xinjiang, making up just over 45% of the population. The Uyghur movement's use of militant separatism has resulted in it being described as a dangerous movement. In particular, the Eastern Turkestan Islamic Movement (ETIM) is a proscribed terrorist organisation, according to classification by the United Nations. Among other incidents, East Turkestan independence movement organisations have claimed responsibility for the 2008 Kunming bus bombings; however, China denied that the group was responsible. The Uyghur Human Rights Project alleges that China often exaggerates these threats to justify repression of the Uyghur people.

Details
Two attackers were involved in the incident near the western city of Kashgar. The Xinhua News Agency said the attack happened at about 08:00 (00:00 GMT). One of the men drove a dump truck into a group of border patrol police officers as they were jogging on a street. The attacker then got out of the truck and started attacking other officers with homemade explosives. The explosives went off prematurely and blew off one of his arms. The other attacker threw improvised explosive devices at a nearby police office. He then went into the building with a knife, but was subdued by police officers inside the complex. Both perpetrators were captured during the raid. Fourteen policemen died at the scene and two died on the way to the hospital; another 16 policemen were hurt, Xinhua state news agency reported. The attackers were later identified as males, taxi driver Kurbanjan Hemit (28), and vegetable vendor Abdurahman Azat (33). They are members of the Uyghur ethnic group, and it was suspected that the attack was a terrorist action by Eastern Turkistan separatists.

Xinhua called the incident a terrorist attack. Police investigators reported that they had recovered documents calling for a holy war, a homemade firearm, and nine explosives,  whose design was similar to the explosives found in a raid on an ETIM facility in January 2007. Xinjiang's regional public security department also claimed that it had received intelligence that the East Turkestan independence movement planned to carry out terrorist attacks during the week before the opening ceremonies of the Olympic games. This incident happened four days before the Beijing Olympics, after repeated warnings in recent months from the Chinese government that militants from the restive Xinjiang region were planning to stage attacks to disrupt the Games.

In September 2008, the New York Times reported that three tourists who witnessed the events disputed central details of the official story.  The eyewitnesses claimed that no explosions were heard and that the attackers appeared to be machete-wielding police officers attacking other uniformed men.

Reactions
The exiled Uyghur Muslim leader and human rights activist Rebiya Kadeer condemned the reported attack and stated that "China is using the 2008 Olympics as an opportunity to further demonise the Uighur people's legitimate and peaceful struggle and justify its heavy-handed repression in the region." The Chinese government reacted with a clampdown in Kashgar and Xinjiang, increasing security checks and restricting independent news coverage.

Detention of media
On the night of 4 August, a Tokyo Shimbun cameraman and a Japanese TV reporter, along with two Hong Kong reporters making reports near the police post, were detained by security. The two Hong Kong reporters were not harmed. However, the Japanese reporters were beaten and punched. All four were released after two hours of detention. The Japanese government protested against the Chinese actions, although it has made no formal statement as there was no confirmation. Chinese officials and police in Kashgar have apologised for the incident, but accused the two men of breaking rules.

See also
 2008 Uyghur unrest
 2008 Summer Olympics

References

2008 disasters in China
East Turkestan independence movement
21st century in Xinjiang
Improvised explosive device bombings in China
Islamic terrorism in China
Islamic terrorist incidents in 2008
Kashgar
Mass murder in 2008
Terrorist incidents in China in 2008
Xinjiang conflict
Terrorist incidents involving knife attacks
Terrorist incidents involving vehicular attacks
Turkistan Islamic Party
August 2008 events in China
Vehicular rampage in China 
China
21st-century mass murder in China